Branscomb may refer to:

Locations
Branscomb, California
Branscomb Glacier

Surname
Harvie Branscomb (1894–1998), American university administrator
John Warren Branscomb (1905–1959), American Bishop of the Methodist Church
Lewis C. Branscomb (1865-1930), American Methodist minister and temperance leader
Lewis M. Branscomb (born 1926), American physicist

See also
Branscombe (disambiguation)